Jacob Everse Pullen (born November 10, 1989) is an American-Georgian professional basketball player for Kuwait SC. He played for the Kansas State Wildcats. Pullen has both American and Georgian citizenship, and has played for the Georgian national team.

College career
In his college debut against Sacramento State, Pullen scored 18 points on 7-of-11 shooting and ended up scoring in double figures in eight of his first 10 games. He was a large part of Kansas State's renewed basketball success. As a freshman, he was one of just three players who appeared in all 33 games. Alongside Michael Beasley, he helped upset #2 Kansas with a season-high 20 points, going 10-for-10 from the free throw line.

In the 2008–09 season, Pullen was one of only two players to start all 34 games for the Wildcats (Luis Colon was the other). He notched his career best of 38 points against Kansas on Feb. 14, 2011. He recorded at least one steal in 27 games of the 2009 season and had at least one three-pointer in 29 games.

In the 2009-10 season, Pullen continued his strong play in his junior season, leading Kansas State to a 29–8 overall record (11–5, Big 12), with wins at Dayton, at UNLV, at Alabama, against Xavier, and against then undefeated, #1-ranked Texas. Playing under coach Frank Martin, Pullen averaged 19.3 points per game on 41.9% shooting. With backcourt mate Denis Clemente, Pullen received accolades for his part in the turnaround in K-State's basketball. In 2009–2010, Pullen and Clemente combined for the third-highest points-per-game of any guard tandem in school history, at almost 35 combined points. They trailed only the combo of Mike Evans and Chuckie Williams (who averaged more in both the 1974–75, and 1975–76 seasons) in the K-State record books. The two led the Wildcats to the Elite Eight of the NCAA Tournament before eventually losing to Butler. Pullen was selected to the  All Big-12 Team that year. As a senior, Pullen and the Cats lost to Wisconsin in the third round of the NCAA tournament and he was named a Fourth Team All-American by Fox Sports. Pullen is the All Time Scoring Leader in the history of Kansas State University Men's Basketball with 2,132 career points.

Professional career

2011–12 season
Pullen went undrafted in the 2011 NBA draft. On July 12, 2011, he signed with Angelico Biella of the Italian Lega Basket Serie A for the 2011–12 season.

2012–13 season
In July 2012, Pullen joined the Philadelphia 76ers for the 2012 NBA Summer League. On August 31, 2012, he signed with Hapoel Jerusalem of the Israeli Basketball Super League for the 2012–13 season. On March 13, 2013, he signed with Virtus Bologna of Italy for the rest of the season.

2013–14 season
On August 13, 2013, Pullen signed with FC Barcelona of Spain for the 2013–14 season. On 8 March 2014, Pullen scored 12 three-point field goals in a 111-66 win over CB Valladolid, breaking the Liga ACB single-game record, which was previously held by Oscar Schmidt.

2014–15 season
In August 2014, he signed with Liaoning Flying Leopards of the Chinese Basketball Association. However, he left Liaoning before the start of the season. On September 28, 2014, Pullen returned to Spain and signed with Baloncesto Sevilla. On November 7, 2014, he parted ways with Sevilla.

On November 14, 2014, he signed with New Basket Brindisi of Italy for the rest of the season.

2015–16 season
On August 8, 2015, Pullen signed with Cedevita Zagreb of Croatia for the 2015–16 season.

2016–17 season
On September 29, 2016, Pullen signed a one-month deal with Russian club Khimki. On October 31, he re-signed with Khimki for the rest of the season. He was officially released from the Russian team on July 4, 2017.

2017–18 season
On September 22, 2017, Pullen signed with the Philadelphia 76ers. On October 14, his contract was converted to a two-way deal. Under terms of the deal, he split time between the 76ers and their G League affiliate, the Delaware 87ers. On January 4, 2018, he was waived by the 76ers after appearing in three NBA games.

On January 7, 2018, Pullen signed with Mahram Tehran of the Iranian Super League for the rest of the season.

On February 20, 2018, Pullen signed with Afyon Belediye of the Turkish second-tier Turkish Basketball First League (TBL). With Afyon, he won promotion to the first-tier Basketbol Süper Ligi (BSL) after winning the play-off finals.

2018–19 season
On November 1, 2018, Pullen returned to Cedevita Zagreb for his second stint with the club.

Mornar (2019–2021)
On July 12, 2019, Pullen signed with Montenegrin club Mornar Bar of the ABA League.

Pullen averaged 16 points, three assists, and 1.4 assists per game during the 2020–21 season with Mornar Bar.

2021–22 season
On August 9, 2021, Pullen signed with KK Cedevita Olimpija of the Slovenian Basketball League.

National team career
In August, 2012, Pullen was granted Georgian citizenship, which increased his career options across Europe and allowed him to play for the Georgian national team in EuroBasket 2013.  He began playing with the team during EuroBasket qualification in 2012.

NBA statistics

|-
| align="left" | 2017–18
| align="left" | Philadelphia
| 3 || 0 || 2.0 || .500 || .000 || N/A || .0 || .0 || .0 || .0 || .7
|-
| align="left" | Career
| align="left" | 
| 3 || 0 || 2.0 || .500 || .000 || N/A || .0 || .0 || .0 || .0 || .7

See also
 2010 NCAA Men's Basketball All-Americans

References

External links
 
 Jacob Pullen at eurobasket.com
 Jacob Pullen at euroleague.net
 Jacob Pullen at fiba.com
 Jacob Pullen at fiba.com (Archive)
 Jacob Pullen  at legabasket.it (Italian)

1989 births
Living people
African-American basketball players
Afyonkarahisar Belediyespor players
All-American college men's basketball players
American expatriate basketball people in Croatia
American expatriate basketball people in Iran
American expatriate basketball people in Israel 
American expatriate basketball people in Italy
American expatriate basketball people in Russia
American expatriate basketball people in Slovenia
American expatriate basketball people in Spain
American expatriate basketball people in Turkey
American men's basketball players
Basketball players from Illinois
BC Khimki players
Delaware 87ers players
FC Barcelona Bàsquet players
Hapoel Jerusalem B.C. players
Kansas State Wildcats men's basketball players
KK Cedevita players
KK Cedevita Olimpija players
Liga ACB players
Mahram Tehran BC players
Men's basketball players from Georgia (country)
New Basket Brindisi players
Pallacanestro Biella players
Philadelphia 76ers players
Point guards
Real Betis Baloncesto players
Shooting guards
Sportspeople from Maywood, Illinois
Undrafted National Basketball Association players
Virtus Bologna players
21st-century African-American sportspeople
20th-century African-American people
Kuwait SC basketball players